This is a list of FIPS 10-4 country codes for Countries, Dependencies, Areas of Special Sovereignty, and Their Principal Administrative Divisions.

The two-letter country codes were used by the US government for geographical data processing in many publications, such as the CIA World Factbook. The standard is also known as DAFIF 0413 ed 7 Amdt. No. 3 (Nov 2003) and as DIA 65-18 (Defense Intelligence Agency, 1994, "Geopolitical Data Elements and Related Features").

The FIPS standard includes both the codes for independent countries (similar but sometimes incompatible with the ISO 3166-1 alpha-2 standard) and the codes for top-level subdivision of the countries (similar to but usually incompatible with the ISO 3166-2 standard). The ISO 3166 codes are used by the United Nations and for Internet top-level country code domains.

Non-sovereign entities are in italics.

On September 2, 2008, FIPS 10-4 was one of ten standards withdrawn by NIST as a Federal Information Processing Standard.  It was replaced in the U.S. Government by the Geopolitical Entities, Names, and Codes (GENC), which is based on ISO 3166.

A

B

C

D

E

F

G

H

I

J

K

L

M

N

O

P

Q

R

S

T

U

V

W

Y

Z

Resources
 

The complete standard can be found at:
https://web.archive.org/web/20090201000438/http://www.itl.nist.gov/fipspubs/fip10-4.htm

Updates to previous version of the standard (before FIPS-10 was withdrawn in September 2008) are at:
https://web.archive.org/web/20070106052615/http://earth-info.nga.mil/gns/html/fips_files.htm.

Updates to the standard since September 2008 are at:
https://web.archive.org/web/20110903191340/http://earth-info.nga.mil/gns/html/gazetteers2.html.
 FIPS PUB 10-4: Federal Information Processing Standard 10-4: Countries, Dependencies, Areas of Special Sovereignty, and Their Principal Administrative Divisions, April 1995
 DAFIF 0413, Edition 7, Amendment No. 3, November 2003
 DIA 65-18: Defense Intelligence Agency, Geopolitical Data Elements and Related Features, 1994

See also
 List of FIPS region codes

References

External links
 UK MOD Ontology Demonstrator – integrates NATO STANAG 1059 codes with ISO3166 and FIPS10-4 codes

Lists of country codes
Country codes
Location codes